Jorge Roberto Aguilar Mondaca (born 8 January 1985) is a Chilean former professional tennis player.

Tennis career

Juniors
In 2001 won the U16 world championship with best friend Guillermo Hormazábal and Carlos Rios. Aguilar reached as high as No. 14 in the junior world singles rankings in 2002 (and No. 22 in doubles).

Pro tour
On 8 March 2010, he made his debut in Davis Cup singles for disputing the fifth point of the series against Israel, facing Harel Levy, defeating him 7–6(7–3), 6–1. One day before his debut in doubles with Paul Capdeville, falling in five sets to the Israeli couple experienced Jonathan Erlich and Andy Ram. In that series 4–1 Chile defeated the team of Israel, thus Chile ranks second round, where they will face the Czech Republic.

On 10 October 2015, Aguilar announced his retirement from professional tennis after his participation in the Future F6 in Santiago de Chile. In his last match, he lost against Guillermo Rivera-Aránguiz in the final, 3–6, 6–4, 5–7. Following his retirement, Aguilar also announced that he would be the head coach of Chilean tennis player Cristian Garín for the remainder of the 2015 season.

ATP Challenger & ITF Futures finals

Singles: 41 (22-19)

Doubles: 58 (36-22)

References

External links
 
 

1985 births
Living people
Chilean male tennis players
Tennis players from Santiago
Tennis players at the 2007 Pan American Games
Tennis players at the 2011 Pan American Games
Pan American Games silver medalists for Chile
Pan American Games medalists in tennis
South American Games bronze medalists for Chile
South American Games medalists in tennis
Competitors at the 2014 South American Games
Medalists at the 2007 Pan American Games
21st-century Chilean people